Gabriel Hachen (born October 16, 1990) is an Argentine professional footballer who plays for Independiente.

References

External links
Ascenso MX profile

1990 births
Living people
Argentine footballers
Argentine people of German descent
Argentine expatriate footballers
Association football forwards
Newell's Old Boys footballers
Atlante F.C. footballers
Dorados de Sinaloa footballers
FC Juárez footballers
Defensa y Justicia footballers
Club Atlético Independiente footballers
Argentine Primera División players
Liga MX players
Ascenso MX players
Expatriate footballers in Mexico
Argentine expatriate sportspeople in Mexico
Footballers from Santa Fe, Argentina